Green Heroine is an adventure story arc of the Philippine comic strip series Pugad Baboy, created by Pol Medina Jr. This particular story arc lasts 87 strips long and was published in the Philippine Daily Inquirer from November 2011 to March 2012. In June 2012, the story arc was reprinted in the 24th compilation of the comic strip series, named PB24. For the first time in the series, Cristina "Tiny" Sungcal and her gay friend Pao Tang appear as main characters.

Synopsis
One day, Tiny seeks Mang Dagul's help in a field trip to the National Center for Mental Health (NCMH) in Mandaluyong as part of a school field trip. Bab drops her off instead. After the trip, Tiny tells her experiences to Pao in a series of flashbacks that break the fourth wall. 

In the asylum, Tiny interviews a deranged patient named Dr Arnibal Necter, who calls her Agent CS of the Fat Bitch Ingenue (FBI) agency. Over the course of the interview, Dr Necter makes a series of cryptic predictions. Tiny and Pao connect two predictions on recent events: the sabotage of a biodiesel-producing liposuction clinic that botched an operation on US Ambassador to the Philippines Harry Thomas and the destruction of a local jatropha farm using swarms of the Pennsylvania marmorated stink bug and the California scutellarid bug - insects only found in the US. The duo's research identifies a piggery in Cavite and a hydrogen processing plant as possible targets. Tiny visits the plant and talks to the supervisor, averting an explosion that could be traced to hydrogen vapors. As Tiny calls Pao to report on the latest development, Pao himself crashes from the sky in front of her. 

Pao explains that she visited the piggery and met a Korean man named Mr Shin (who often emphasizes the word SHIN in a loud voice). He says the piggery's waste is processed at a co-located methane research facility for alternative fuel in passenger cars. However, the facility explodes when a door Shin opens triggers a whole set of matches attached to one door, thereby lighting the methane gas and sending the two into the air. Tiny and Pao head to an ethanol production plant in Tarlac that could be another target. A man in shades, jeans, and jacket named the "Tsimaymenator" kidnaps the plant's consultant, Ciara Connor, and escapes despite the FBI agents shooting him and his goons with special nonlethal darts. The kidnapping fumes Connor's husband, Christian Bale Connor.

Reflecting on two more of Dr Necter's predictions, Tiny matches them to a purported leak of sulfuric acid from a battery plant in Sta Rosa, Laguna and a potential terrorist threat at an international bio-energy conference held in the Manila Hotel. While scoping out the security at the hotel, Tiny chances upon Ciara at the women's restroom and tries to get her out of the hotel - only to run into several bodyguards. Polgas appears to bring Ciara to safety while Tiny and Pao fight off their pursuers. Tiny turns into another alter-ego named Obesa Vanidosa and sends some agents into a long chase. Obesa rejoins Pao, and so does Mr Shin, who has finally crashed back to the ground after the plant explosion in time to squash the Tsimaymenator from killing the two. 

The group heads to the safehouse - a nipa hut - in San Pablo, Laguna, but Pao gets a hunch about being followed. It is proven true as their Toyota Prius and the safehouse is blown up apparently by Predator drones. Fortunately, the entire safehouse is specially armored underneath the thatching, and Obesa uses a special rod to fire explosive anti-vehicle rounds at two black Ford E-150 vans carrying the agents from the hotel. When the vans are destroyed, Ciara identifies the drone that attacked them as an Avenger, which repositions for another attack until Mr Shin flies into the air to forcibly crash it. Obesa, Pao, and Mr Shin finally mop up the remaining agents. Obesa reverts to Tiny and introduces herself to Mr Shin - who recognizes Ciara as Dr Alecx dela Cruz, a senior consultant in his methane plant.

Now angered at the subterfuge, Tiny and Pao crosscheck and learn that Connor/dela Cruz is actually Dr Cristina Torres, who worked at the hydrogen plant Tiny visited earlier (also as a consultant). Tiny deduces that the consultancy job was a cover for the sabotage operations. She forces Torres to come clean and make sense of all the evidence compiled against her.

Torres explains that the Tsimaymenator was actually in Tarlac to rescue her now that her cover was blown and reveals that a Detroit-based syndicate of American muscle car enthusiasts plotted the sabotage to stifle research on alternative fuels. To Tiny and Pao's surprise, she admits that Dr Necter was the group's chief saboteur, whose handiwork in tampering the Prius' brake and acceleration systems resulted in its recall. However, he went soft after refusing to participate in the murder of Gerry Ortega and returned to the US to announce his exit from the group (but not before stowing sugar in the gas tanks and carburetors of the members' cars, plus putting rotten meat in the trunks of cars upholstered with horse hide leather).

Tiny returns to the NCMH and confronts Dr Necter about the revelations. He states that the beauty of Palawan made him appreciate the environment more and changed his goal to promote clean energy. As Mr Shin distracts the NCMH staff with a photo shoot, Tiny and Torres blast open Dr Necter's cell and spring him. Dr Necter and Dr Torres fly back to the US to settle their scores with the group.

Epilogue
Tiny laments that despite the best efforts of current researchers, she would never see the widespread use of sustainable energy for cars in her lifetime. She and Pao get wind of a news report about a sinkhole that apparently formed underneath a car engine factory in Detroit and presume that Dr Necter did it. Pao is stunned to see that Mr Shin - whom he desires as a sugar daddy - is actually gay. Due to more fourth wall-breaking actions (the last of which has Mr. Shin, who by then was speaking in Tagalog, reminding everyone that they are all in a comic, where everything is possible), the creator, Pol Medina Jr., then has the Tsimaymenator (referred to as Arnold, by this point it is nothing more than an endoskeleton) close the story arc with "Diz story iz terminated!"

Real-life references
Tiny's alter-ego and Dr Necter is a reference to Agent Clarice Starling and Hannibal Lecter. She states that the trip to the NCMH is required because her professor will make her entire class watch the drama series Budoy (about a mentally impaired young man).
 The Tsimaymenator is a portmanteau of the Tagalog slang word tsimay (househelp) and the famous movie character Terminator, played by Arnold Schwarzenegger (true enough, his T-800 endoskeleton is revealed underneath). The Tsimaymenator even asks Ciara Connor in the same manner that the Terminator tries to identify Sarah Connor for termination. A line he utters, "You are sperminated!", and a pregnancy kit testing positive, is a throwback to the revelation in 2011 about Schwarzenegger siring a child with his own househelp.  In preparing to kill Tiny and Pao with his Minigun, he accidentally utters part of Tony Montana's classic catchphrase before remembering that it was the wrong movie. His family jewels are also compared to that of Filipino lawyer Ferdinand Topacio, who gladly wagered one of his testicles to be cut off during a controversy involving former President Gloria Macapagal-Arroyo's potential flight from justice in 2011. 
Pao shoots the Tsimaymenator's goons with concentrated estrogen darts, which triggers eight minutes of homosexual behavior - in this case, the goons dance to New York, New York. They later try to tempt a police officer booking them with gossip about whether young Filipino actress Rhian Ramos had an abortion.
Connor's husband, Christian Bale Connor, is based on actor Christian Bale, who both played the role of Batman & John Connor in Terminator:Salvation. He appears in the Tumbler after she is kidnapped.
In explaining the attack by Predator drones on the safehouse, Tiny tells Dr Torres to snap out of her claims about the US deployment of the drones in the Philippines. The AFP has denied its use in the country's airspace. 
In making Dr Necter's escape, Dr Torres drives a Tesla Roadster.
A single strip features Obesa Vanidosa being chased by agents. Some bystanders in the background assume the entire scene as part of the Manila shooting of the Bourne Legacy (with Tiny as an apparently obese Rachel Weisz).

References

Bibliography
Medina, Pol. PB24, Pol Medina Jr Novelties, 2012.
 

Pugad Baboy
2011 works
2012 works